Paulo Colaiacovo (born January 27, 1983) is a Canadian former professional ice hockey goaltender. He is the identical twin brother of National Hockey League defenceman Carlo Colaiacovo. He was born in Toronto, Ontario.

Playing career

Colaiacovo played in the Ontario Hockey League with the Barrie Colts. He joined the Colorado Eagles in the Central Hockey League in 2004, and missed over half the season because of injury, but returned to the team late in the 2004-2005 season to netmind the team through winning the Ray Miron President's Cup.

When the Eagles re-signed him for the following season, the team vice-president and head coach was quoted as saying "Championships are won with good goaltending, and with the signing of Paulo, it will give our team that opportunity again".

In the summer of 2006, it was rumored that Colaiacovo was considering retirement, but he said his break was to heal from injuries and "to take some time off so [he] could pursue [his] career a lot longer". Colaiacovo rejoined the Eagles on the ice in 2007, but later left Colorado to play in the Netherlands. After winning both the National Cup and Dutch Championship with Tilburg Trappers, Paulo returned to Canada to play for the Toronto organization on a 'black ace' contract.

On July 20, 2009, Colaiacovo signed a contract with the Bloomington PrairieThunder of the International Hockey League.

Awards
2004 OHL All Star team member
2004 OHL Goaltender of the Year 
2006 Central Hockey League All Star team member

Statistics

External links

Tilburg Trappers site
Colorado Eagles site
Photo of Colaiacovo after an Eagles win on March 10, 2007

References

1983 births
Barrie Colts players
Belleville Bulls players
Canadian ice hockey goaltenders
Canadian people of Italian descent
Colorado Eagles players
Identical twins
Living people
Ice hockey people from Toronto
Canadian twins
Twin sportspeople